Lithium iodate (LiIO3) is a negative uniaxial crystal for nonlinear, acousto-optical and piezoelectric applications. It has been utilized for 347 nm ruby lasers.

Properties
Mohs hardness of lithium iodate is 3.5–4.

References

Lithium compounds
Iodates
Nonlinear optical materials